Urania Genève Sport is a Swiss omnisport club based in Geneva. Its football section was founded in 1896.

The current club was born in 1922 through a merger between FC Urania and FC Genève.

Its main title is the Swiss cup, won in 1929 against Young Boys. This same year, the club is champion of the French part of Switzerland (Champion romand).

In 1931, UGS finishes at the second place of the Swiss championship, behind Grasshopper Club Zürich.

Presently UGS plays in the fifth Swiss division, a non professional league.

Players

Managers

 Waldvogel (1928–29)
 Conrad Ross (1932)
 Albert Châtelain (1940–49)
 Ludwick Dupal (1949–50)
 Georges Aeby (1950–53)
 Genia Walachek (1953–60)			
 Albert Châtelain (1961–71)
 Roland Guillod (1971–72)
 René Schneider (1972–73)
 Albert Châtelain (1973–74)
 Francis Anker (1974–76)
 Gaston Sar (1976–77)
 Jean Coutaz
 Rody Tschan (1981–84)
 Paul Garbani (1987–89)
 Gérard Castella (1989–93)
 Miroslav Tlokinski (1993–94)
 Paul Garbani (1994–95)
 Paul Garbani (1997-01)
 Albert Châtelain (2001–02)
 Jean-Noël Dumont (2002–05)
 Borisav Mitrovic (2005–07)
 David Joye (2008–09)
 Philippe Tschiember (2009–13)
 Hervé Musquère (2013 – ?)

Honours

League 
Swiss Super League:
Runners-up (1): 1930–31
Swiss Challenge League:
Winners (3):  1947–48, 1954–55, 1964–65
Runners-up (1): 1945–46

Cup 
Swiss Cup:
Winners (1): 1928–29
Runners-up (1): 1931–32

External links
 

Football clubs in Switzerland
Association football clubs established in 1896
Sport in Geneva
1896 establishments in Switzerland
Urania Genève Sport